Mud Island is an island in the Detroit River International Wildlife Refuge, in southeast Michigan. It is in Wayne County. Once owned by National Steel, white bass and perch are now caught there.

References

Islands of Wayne County, Michigan
Islands of the Detroit River
River islands of Michigan